Dead Poets Society is a 1989 American drama film directed by Peter Weir, written by Tom Schulman, and starring Robin Williams. Set in 1959 at the fictional elite conservative boarding school Welton Academy, it tells the story of an English teacher who inspires his students through his teaching of poetry.

The film was a commercial success and received numerous accolades, including Academy Award nominations for Best Picture, Best Director, and Best Actor for Williams. The film won the BAFTA Award for Best Film, the César Award for Best Foreign Film and the David di Donatello Award for Best Foreign Film. Schulman received the Academy Award for Best Original Screenplay for his work.

Plot

In 1959, Todd Anderson begins his junior year of high school at Welton Academy, an all-male preparatory boarding school in Vermont. Assigned one of Welton's most promising students, senior Neil Perry, as his roommate, he meets his friends: Knox Overstreet, Richard Cameron, Steven Meeks, Gerard Pitts, and Charlie Dalton.

On the first day of classes, the boys are surprised by the unorthodox teaching methods of new English teacher, John Keating. A Welton alumnus himself, Keating encourages his students to "make your lives extraordinary", a sentiment he summarizes with the Latin expression carpe diem ("seize the day").

Subsequent lessons include Keating having the students take turns standing on his desk to demonstrate ways to look at life differently, telling them to rip out the introduction of their poetry books which explains a mathematical formula used for rating poetry, and inviting them to make up their own style of walking in a courtyard to encourage their individualism. Keating's methods attract the attention of strict headmaster, Gale Nolan.

Upon learning that Keating was a member of the unsanctioned Dead Poets Society while at Welton, Neil restarts the club and he and his friends sneak off campus to a cave where they read poetry. As the school year progresses, Keating's lessons and their involvement with the club encourage them to live their lives on their own terms. Knox pursues Chris Noel, an attractive cheerleader who is dating Chet Danburry, a football player from a local public school whose family is friends with his.

Neil discovers his love of acting and gets the role as Puck in a local production of A Midsummer Night's Dream, despite the fact that his domineering father wants him to attend Harvard to study medicine. Meanwhile, Keating helps Todd come out of his shell and realize his potential when he takes him through an exercise in self-expression, resulting in his composing a poem spontaneously in front of the class.

Charlie publishes an article in the school newspaper in the club's name suggesting that girls be admitted to Welton. Nolan paddles Charlie to coerce him into revealing who else is in the Dead Poets Society, but he resists. Nolan also speaks with Keating, warning him that he should discourage his students from questioning authority. Keating admonishes the boys in his manner, warning that one must assess all consequences.

Neil becomes devastated after his father discovers his involvement in the play and demands he quit on the eve of the opening performance. He goes to Keating, who advises him to stand his ground and prove to his father that his love of acting is something he takes seriously. Neil's father unexpectedly shows up at the performance. He angrily takes Neil home and has him withdrawn from Welton and enrolled in a military academy. Lacking any support from his concerned mother, and unable to explain how he feels to his father, a distraught Neil commits suicide.

Nolan investigates Neil's death at the request of the Perry family. Cameron blames Neil's death on Keating to escape punishment for his own participation in the Dead Poets Society, and names the other members. Confronted by Charlie, Cameron urges the rest of them to let Keating take the fall. Charlie punches Cameron and is expelled. Each of the boys is called to Nolan's office to sign a letter attesting to the truth of Cameron's allegations, even knowing they are false. When Todd's turn comes, he is reluctant to sign, but does so after seeing that the others have complied and succumbs to his parents' pressure.

Keating is fired and Nolan, who taught English at Welton prior to becoming headmaster, takes over teaching the class, with the intent of adhering to traditional Welton rules. Keating interrupts the class to gather his leftover belongings. As he leaves, Todd reveals to Keating that the boys were intimidated into signing the paper that sealed his fate, and he assures Todd that he believes him. Nolan threatens to expel Todd. Todd stands up on his desk, with the words "O Captain! My Captain!", which prompts Nolan to threaten him again. The other members of the Dead Poets Society (except for Cameron), as well as several other students in the class, do the same, to Nolan's fury and Keating's pleased surprise. Touched by their support, Keating proudly thanks the boys and departs.

Cast

Production

Development 
The original script was written by Tom Schulman, based on his experiences at the Montgomery Bell Academy in Nashville, Tennessee, particularly with his inspirational teacher Samuel Pickering. 

Jeff Kanew was originally hired as the director, and Kanew had envisioned Liam Neeson in the role of Keating. Other actors considered for the role were Dustin Hoffman, Mel Gibson, Tom Hanks, and Mickey Rourke. Robin Williams, Touchstone Pictures preferred choice, was ultimately cast, but on the first day of shooting outside Atlanta, Williams did not show as he did not want to work with Kanew. The studio burned down the already-built sets and replaced Kanew with another director. 

In late 1988, Peter Weir had met with Jeffrey Katzenberg at Disney. Katzenberg, who oversaw Touchstone, suggested Weir read Schulman's script. On a flight back to Sydney, Weir was captivated and six weeks later returned to Los Angeles to cast the principal characters. It was not until Weir was given directing duties that filming began in earnest. 

In Schulman's manuscript, Keating had been ill and slowly dying of Hodgkin lymphoma, with a scene showing him on his deathbed in the hospital. This was removed by Weir who deemed it unnecessary, claiming this would focus audiences on Keating's illness and not on what he stood for.

Early notes from Disney on the script also suggested making the boys' passion dancing rather than poetry, as well as a new title, Sultans of Swing, focusing on the character of Mr. Keating rather than on the boys themselves, but both were dismissed outright.

Filming
Filming began in the November of 1988 wrapped in January of 1989, and took place at St. Andrew's School and the Everett Theatre in Middletown, Delaware, and at locations in New Castle, Delaware, and in nearby Wilmington, Delaware. Classroom scenes with Keating were filmed in a replica classroom built on a soundstage in Wilmington. During the shooting, Weir requested the young cast not to use modern slang, even off camera. Weir also said he hid a half-day's worth of filming from Disney executives in order to allow Williams free range to use his comedy improvisational skills. 

During filming, Williams used to crack many jokes on set, which Ethan Hawke found incredibly irritating. For the scene where Todd Anderson is spontaneously incited by John Keating to make a poem in front of the class, Williams apparently made a joke saying that Hawke was intimidating, which Hawke later realized was serious and that the joke referred to his earnestness and intensity as a young man. Ironically, Hawke's first agent signed with Hawke once Williams told him that Hawke would "do really well".

Reception

Box office
The worldwide box office was reported as $235,860,579, which includes domestic grosses of $95,860,116. The film's global receipts were the fifth highest for 1989, and the highest for dramas.

Critical response
On review aggregator Rotten Tomatoes, the film holds an approval rating of 84% based on 61 reviews with an average score of 7.2/10. The website's critical consensus reads, "Affecting performances from the young cast and a genuinely inspirational turn from Robin Williams grant Peter Weir's prep school drama top honors." On Metacritic, the film received a score of 79 based on 14 reviews, indicating "generally favorable reviews". Audiences polled by CinemaScore gave the film a rare "A+" grade.

The Washington Posts reviewer called it "solid, smart entertainment", and praised Robin Williams for giving a "nicely restrained acting performance". Vincent Canby of The New York Times also praised Williams' "exceptionally fine performance", while writing that "Dead Poets Society ... is far less about Keating than about a handful of impressionable boys". Pauline Kael was unconvinced about the film, and its "middlebrow highmindedness", but praised Williams. "Robin Williams' performance is more graceful than anything he's done before [–] he's totally, concentratedly there – [he] reads his lines stunningly, and when he mimics various actors reciting Shakespeare there's no undue clowning in it; he's a gifted teacher demonstrating his skills."

Roger Ebert's review gave the film two out of four stars. He criticized Williams for spoiling an otherwise creditable dramatic performance by occasionally veering into his onstage comedian's persona, and lamented that for a film set in the 1950s there was no mention of the Beat Generation writers. Additionally, Ebert described the film as an often poorly constructed "collection of pious platitudes ... The movie pays lip service to qualities and values that, on the evidence of the screenplay itself, it is cheerfully willing to abandon."

On their Oscar nomination edition of Siskel & Ebert, both Gene Siskel (who also gave the film a mixed review) and Ebert disagreed with Williams' Oscar nomination; Ebert said that he would have swapped Williams with either Matt Dillon for Drugstore Cowboy or John Cusack for Say Anything. On their If We Picked the Winners special in March 1990, Ebert chose the film's Best Picture nomination as the worst nomination of the year, believing it took a slot that could have gone to Spike Lee's Do the Right Thing.

Film historian Leonard Maltin wrote: "Well made, extremely well acted, but also dramatically obvious and melodramatically one-sided. Nevertheless, Tom Schulman's screenplay won an Oscar."

John Simon, writing for National Review, said Dead Poets Society was the most dishonest film he had seen in some time.

Accolades

American Film Institute Lists
 AFI's 100 Years...100 Heroes and Villains:
 John Keating – Nominated Hero
 AFI's 100 Years...100 Movie Quotes:
 "Carpe diem. Seize the day, boys. Make your lives extraordinary." – #95
 AFI's 100 Years...100 Cheers – #52

The film was voted #52 on the AFI's 100 Years…100 Cheers list, a list of the top 100 most inspiring films of all time.

The film's line "Carpe diem. Seize the day, boys. Make your lives extraordinary." was voted as the 95th greatest movie quote by the American Film Institute.

Legacy
After Robin Williams' death in August 2014, fans of his work used social media to pay tribute to him with photo and video reenactments of the film's final "O Captain! My Captain!" scene.

Adaptations
Nancy H. Kleinbaum's novel Dead Poets Society (1989) is based on the movie.

Stage play
A theatrical adaptation written by Tom Schulman and directed by John Doyle opened Off-Broadway on October 27, 2016, and ran through December 11, 2016. Jason Sudeikis starred as John Keating with Thomas Mann as Neil Perry, David Garrison as Gale Nolan, Zane Pais as Todd Anderson, Francesca Carpanini as Chris, Stephen Barker Turner as Mr. Perry, Will Hochman as Knox Overstreet, Cody Kostro as Charlie Dalton, Yaron Lotan as Richard Cameron, and Bubba Weiler as Steven Meeks.

The production received a mixed review from The New York Times, with critic Ben Brantley calling the play "blunt and bland", and criticizing Sudeikis's performance, citing his lack of enthusiasm when delivering powerful lines.

In 2018, the theatrical adaptation of the film, written by Tom Schulman and directed by Francisco Franco, premiered in Mexico. The Mexican actor Alfonso Herrera played the main character.

Parodies
The ending of the film was parodied in the Saturday Night Live sketch "Farewell, Mr. Bunting", in which a student, upon climbing onto his desk, is decapitated by a ceiling fan.

See also
 "The Changing of the Guard", a June 1, 1962 episode of The Twilight Zone starring Donald Pleasence as a retiring English teacher at a New England boys' school, who questions whether he has made a difference in the boys' lives.
 The Emperor's Club (2002), an American drama film set in a boys' preparatory school in the northeast.

References

Further reading

External links

 
 
 
 

1989 films
1980s coming-of-age drama films
1980s buddy drama films
1980s teen drama films
American buddy drama films
American coming-of-age drama films
American high school films
American teen drama films
1980s English-language films
Best Film BAFTA Award winners
Best Foreign Film César Award winners
Films about educators
Films about poetry
Films about student societies
Films about suicide
Films about teacher–student relationships
Films set in 1959
Films set in Vermont
Films shot in Delaware
Films whose writer won the Best Original Screenplay Academy Award
Touchstone Pictures films
Warner Bros. films
Films scored by Maurice Jarre
Films directed by Peter Weir
Films set in boarding schools
1989 drama films
Films produced by Steven Haft
1980s American films